In theoretical physics, conformal supergravity is the study of the supersymmetrized version of conformal gravity with Weyl transformations. Equivalently, it is the extension of ordinary supergravity to include Weyl transformations.

Often, nonconformal gravity is described by conformal gravity with a conformal compensator.

For a review of conformal supergravity see E.S. Fradkin and A.A. Tseytlin, "Conformal Supergravity", Phys. Rep.  119  (1985) 233

General relativity
Supersymmetry